The Bama Theatre is a historic theatre in Tuscaloosa, Alabama that currently serves as the city's performing arts center.  Its modern redevelopment is the result of cooperation between the Arts Council of Tuscaloosa and the Tuscaloosa County Parks and Recreation Authority.  The three-story brick and limestone building is located at the corner of Sixth Street and Greensboro Avenue in downtown Tuscaloosa.  It was added to the National Register of Historic Places (NRHP) on August 30, 1984.  It is also a contributing building in the Downtown Tuscaloosa Historic District, NRHP-listed in 1985.

History

Early history 
The Bama Theatre was originally constructed from 1937–38 through Franklin D. Roosevelt's New Deal as a Public Works Administration project.  The building was built as a combination theater and city hall for Tuscaloosa.  It was designed by Birmingham architect David O. Whilldin, who also designed other historically significant buildings in the Tuscaloosa downtown area and worked from the Whilldin Building. The building opened as a theater on April 12, 1938.  The theater was one of the last movie palaces built in the South.  The building features a Streamline Moderne exterior style, popular during the period, and a lavish "atmospheric" interior style that is decorated with a combination of Moderne and Renaissance elements.  Twinkling stars and clouds on the ceiling create an open air feel in the performance hall.  The city hall was moved out the building following the city's acquisition and renovation of the former United States Post Office (built 1909) in 1968.

Renovations 

The theatre was converted to a performing arts center in 1976 and has been completely renovated for live theatrical/concert use.  With the arrival of theater manager David Allgood in 2003, the Bama has become a sought-after venue for touring artists.  The movie fare at The Bama was also revamped, creating the Bama Art House Film Series, featuring independent, foreign, and documentary movies.  Past screenings have included Boyhood, Moonrise Kingdom, Turn Me On, Dammit, Room, and the world premier of John Sayles's Honeydripper, which was filmed in Alabama.  Sayles attended the one-night screening, which drew an audience of nearly 900 people. The Bama continues to be the premier performing arts venue in Tuscaloosa, boasting over 300 nights per year of concerts, movies, dance, and live theater.

The central panel of the theatre marquee was replaced with an LED screen in March 2017.

Performance groups 
The Bama Theatre is home to several performance groups from Tuscaloosa and the surrounding area.  The Tuscaloosa Children's Theatre and Tuscaloosa Community Dancers perform at the theater 2-3 times a year each and entertain packed houses with every show.  The ACT ("Actors' Charitable Theatre") performs 3-4 shows annually.  The theatre is also home to several dance school end-of-year recitals including The Dance Centre and The Academy of Ballet and Jazz. The Tuscaloosa Academy Players, Tuscaloosa County High School Drama Dept and Brookwood Drama Department have also all enjoyed great success with their productions in this historic space.

References

External links 

 http://www.bamatheatre.org
 https://web.archive.org/web/20090208181539/http://www.tuscarts.org/bamatheatre.html

Theatres in Alabama
Theatres completed in 1938
National Register of Historic Places in Tuscaloosa County, Alabama
Event venues established in 1937
Buildings and structures in Tuscaloosa, Alabama
Tourist attractions in Tuscaloosa, Alabama
Theatres on the National Register of Historic Places in Alabama
Streamline Moderne architecture in Alabama
Public Works Administration in Alabama